Maclean Daniel Ayres, better known as Mac Ayres, is an American R&B singer-songwriter, producer, and multi-instrumentalist.

Personal life 
Ayres grew up in Sea Cliff, New York, and graduated from North Shore High School. He sang in various choral groups as a child, including the Metropolitan Youth Orchestra and the North Shore High School Madrigals. He attended the Berklee College of Music in Boston, Massachusetts, from 2014 to 2017, dropping out to work on his Drive Slow EP.

History
Ayres released his first EP in 2017 titled Drive Slow after dropping out of Berklee that same year. He released his full-length debut album, Something to Feel, the following summer. Ayres' second full-length album, Juicebox, was released in 2019.

In an interview with music blog EarToTheGround Music, Ayres mentioned among his musical influences "Teddy Pendergrass, most of Motown, and especially the iconic Stevie Wonder." His defining artist was D'Angelo, whose album VooDoo "felt like what music is supposed to be to me," according to Ayres.

Discography
Studio albums
Something to Feel (2018)
Juicebox (2019)
Comfortable Enough (2023)

EPs
Drive Slow (2017)
Magic 8ball (2021)

References

American rhythm and blues musicians
Living people
1996 births